Kai Tak is a former constituency in the Kowloon City District.

The constituency returned one district councillor to the Kowloon City District Council, with an election every four years. The seat was last held by Yeung Chun-yu of the Association for Democracy and People's Livelihood before it was abolished in 2015.

Kai Tak constituency was loosely based on the old Kai Tak Airport part of Ma Tau Kok with estimated population of 20,636 in 2011.

Councillors represented

Election results

2010s

2000s

1990s

References

Constituencies of Hong Kong
Constituencies of Kowloon City District Council
1991 establishments in Hong Kong
2015 disestablishments in Hong Kong
Constituencies established in 1991
Constituencies disestablished in 2015